Tom R. Tyler (born March 3, 1950) is a professor of psychology and law at Yale Law School, known for his contributions to understanding why people obey the law.  A 2012 review article on procedural justice by Anthony Bottoms and Justice Tankebe noted that, "Unquestionably the dominant theoretical approach to legitimacy within these disciplines is that of 'procedural justice,' based especially on the work of Tom Tyler.".  Professor Tyler was at New York University, where he was a University Professor, from 1997 until he joined the faculty at Yale in January 2012. He earned his B.A. from Columbia University and Ph.D. from the University of California, Los Angeles.

Scholarship 
Tyler is the author or co-author of 9 books and an editor for 6 others.  His widely cited 1990 book on Why People Obey the Law was republished in 2006 with a new afterword discussing more recent research and changes in his thinking since its initial publication.

Tyler and Huo (2002) is based on surveys of people in different ethnic groups to understand their concepts of justice.  They found that minority African-Americans and Hispanics have essentially the same concept of justice as majority whites but different experiences.  They describe two alternative strategies for effective law enforcement:

 Deterrence:  effective but inefficient 
 Process-based:  efficient and effective

The difference in efficiency follows, because people who perceive that they may be victimized unfairly by law enforcement are less likely to cooperate.  Tyler and Huo's analyses suggests that biased, unprofessional behavior of police, prosecutors and judges not only produces concerns of injustice, it cripples law enforcement efforts by making it more difficult for police and prosecutors to obtain the evidence needed to convict guilty parties.

Tyler and Blader (2000) discussed procedural justice and cooperative behavior and how they impact the performance of more general groups through their effect on social identity and cooperative behavior.

References

Notes 

Yale Law School faculty
Living people
1950 births
American social psychologists
People from Columbus, Ohio
University of California, Los Angeles alumni
Columbia College (New York) alumni